Seminobatrachus is an extinct genus of neotenic salamander from late Paleocene to early Eocene deposits of Cherkassy Region, central Ukraine. It is known from 14 skeletons from a drill hole near Boltyshka village. It was first named by Pavel P. Skutschas and Yuri M. Gubin in 2011 and the type species is Seminobatrachus boltyschkensis.

References

Paleocene amphibians
Eocene amphibians
Cenozoic salamanders
Paleogene amphibians of Europe
Fossil taxa described in 2011